Fat Music Volume 3: Physical Fatness is the third compilation album released by the Fat Wreck Chords record label, in 1997.

Booklet
The cover and booklet for the compilation was designed and illustrated by artist Mark deSalvo in the style of a newspaper, with the liner notes for the band and song information written out as classified ads. The inside fold of the booklet contains the "funny pages" with 17 strips drawn, one for each band on the compilation, most in the style of a syndicated comic series. The following comics are represented:

 NOFX: Peanuts (titled as "NOFXnuts")
 Good Riddance: Unknown
 Snuff: Andy Capp
 Strung Out: Unknown
 Goober Patrol: Hagar the Horrible
 Hi Standard: Beetle Bailey
 Screeching Weasel: Unknown (titled as "Screech goes the Weasel")
 Lagwagon: Family Circus (titled as "Family Lagwagon")
 Bracket: Cathy
 Swingin Utters: Unknown
 No Use for a Name: Unknown; appears to be the Coneheads
 The Dickies: The Wizard of Id (titled as "The Dickies of Od")
 Screw 32: The Fusco Brothers (titled as "Screw 32 Bros.")
 Propaghandi: Dilbert
 Tilt: B.C.
 88 Fingers Louie: Unknown
 Me First & the Gimme Gimmes: Unknown

Track listing

See also
 Fat Wreck Chords compilations

References

Fat Music compilations
1997 compilation albums